The Archives of Pathology & Laboratory Medicine (Arch Pathol Lab Med) is a core clinical medical journal published by the College of American Pathologists and the American Medical Association. It continues in series publications entitled the Archives of Pathology and Laboratory Medicine (1926–28), the Archives of Pathology (1928–50), the A.M.A. Archives of Pathology (1950–60), and the Archives of Pathology (1960–75).

References

External links

Laboratory medicine journals
Pathology journals
Publications established in 1976
Monthly journals
Academic journals published by learned and professional societies of the United States
English-language journals
Allen Press academic journals